Al Qastal may refer to:

 Al Qastal, Jordan
 Al-Qastal, Syria
 Al Qastal, Jerusalem, now Castel National Park